The Dryanovo Monastery (Dryanovski manastir) is a functioning Bulgarian Orthodox monastery situated in the Andaka River Valley, in Bulgarka Nature Park in the central part of Bulgaria five kilometers away from the town of Dryanovo. It was founded in the 12th century, during the Second Bulgarian Empire, and is dedicated to Archangel Michael. Twice burnt down and pillaged during the Ottoman rule of Bulgaria, the monastery was restored at it present place in 1845. It was the site of several battles during the April Uprising of 1876.

Gallery

See also
Bacho Kiro cave
Battle of Shipka Pass  
Bulgarian Orthodox Church 
Bulgarka Nature Park
Etar Architectural-Ethnographic Complex 
Gabrovo 
Shipka Pass 
Sokolski Monastery 
Tryavna 
Uzana

External links

Bulgaria.com page about the monastery
The Dryanovo Monastery at BulgariaTravel.org
Photo gallery of the Dryanovo Monastery

Christian monasteries in Bulgaria
Bulgarian Orthodox monasteries
Buildings and structures in Gabrovo Province
Balkan mountains
Christian monasteries established in the 12th century
Tourist attractions in Gabrovo Province